Mrs Philarmonica (fl. 1715) was the pseudonym of an early-18th century English female, Baroque composer. She published a collection of 6 trio sonatas for two violins with violoncello obbligato and continuo, as well as a set of 6 divertimenti for 2 violins, violoncello or harpsichord (or organ) with Richard Meares in London about 1715. Her actual identity is unknown.

Works
Selected works include:
Sonatas for two violins with violoncello obbligato and continuo (violone, harpsichord or organ) Vol I. Edited by Barbara Jackson (Clar-Nan Editions, 2002).
Sonatas for two violins with violoncello obbligato and continuo (violone, harpsichord or organ) Vol II. Edited by Barbara Jackson (Clar-Nan Editions, 2003).
Sonatas parte seconda: Divertimenti da Camera for 2 violins, violoncello or harpsichord (or organ). Vol. III. Edited by Barbara Jackson (Clar-Nan Editions, 2004).
Sonatas parte seconda: Divertimenti da Camera for 2 violins, violoncello or harpsichord (or organ). Vol IV. Edited by Barbara Jackson (Clar-Nan Editions Clar-Nan Editions, 2005).
Trio Sonata in A for 2 violins, violoncello, harpsichord (Louisville, KY: Editions Ars Femina, 2000) (Check worldcat.org for location or borrow from University of Michigan library.)

References

Date of birth unknown
English Baroque composers
Women classical composers
English classical composers
Year of death unknown
18th-century British women